David Vital Allain (October 8, 1870 – April 15, 1945), son of Vital Allain and Mary Auger born in Neguac, New Brunswick, was a New Brunswick businessman and politician. He was married twice: first to Hélène Allain, then to Emilie Sivret after the death of his first wife.

He was elected to the Legislative Assembly of New Brunswick where he served only one term from 1917 to 1920. Elected in the 1917 general election, he sat as a Liberal member representing Northumberland County. He was defeated in the 1920 general election as well as in a by-election held in October 1921.

References

1870 births
1945 deaths
New Brunswick Liberal Association MLAs